The 2011 BGL Luxembourg Open was a professional women's tennis tournament played on hard courts. It was the 16th edition of the tournament, which was part of the 2011 WTA Tour. It took place in Kockelscheuer, Luxembourg between 17 and 23 October 2011. Victoria Azarenka won the singles title.

Champions

Singles

 Victoria Azarenka defeated  Monica Niculescu 6–2, 6–2
 It was Azarenka's third title of the year, and the eighth of her career.

Doubles

 Iveta Benešová /  Barbora Záhlavová-Strýcová defeated  Lucie Hradecká /  Ekaterina Makarova 7–5, 6–3

Entrants

Seeds

 1 Rankings are as of October 10, 2011.

Other entrants
The following players received wildcards into the singles main draw:
  Angelique Kerber
  Anne Kremer
  Mandy Minella

The following players received entry from the qualifying draw:

  Alexandra Cadanțu
  Anne Keothavong
  Karin Knapp
  Bibiane Schoofs

The following players received entry from a lucky loser spot:
  Lucie Hradecká

External links
Official website 

BGL Luxembourg Open
Luxembourg Open
2011 in Luxembourgian tennis